The Glendale Unified School District is a school district based in Glendale, California, United States.

The school district serves the city of Glendale, portions of the city of La Cañada Flintridge and the unincorporated communities of Montrose and La Crescenta. It consists of 20 elementary schools, 4 middle schools, 4 high schools and 3 facilities for homeschoolers and special-needs students.

In the 2008–2009 school year, the district served 26,744 students and expects enrollment to decline 1–2% in each of the next three years. As of 2002, it was the third-largest district in Los Angeles County and among the thirty-largest in the State of California. It is the 254th largest in the nation by student population.

In 2009 the GUSD had 2,620 employees, of which about half are classroom teachers.

Beginning in the 2016–2017 school year, GUSD started officially commemorating the Armenian genocide, having April 24 off as a holiday. They are the first school district in the nation to do so.

History

In 2013, the district hired the company Geo Listening to monitor social media accounts of students enrolled in the district. Richard Sheehan, the superintendent of Glendale Unified, said "The whole purpose is student safety."

Demographics

In the GUSD, by 1988, Armenians along with students from the Middle East had become the largest ethnic group in the public schools, now having a larger number than the Latinos. Alice Petrossian, the GUSD director of intercultural education, stated that Burbank lies within the middle of other Armenian communities, so it attracted Armenians. In 1987, the district had eight Armenian-speaking teachers and teaching aides, and that year had hired five additional Armenian-speaking teachers and teacher aides. As of 1990, the largest immigrant group speaking an ethnic home language in the GUSD was the Armenians. By 2004, over 33% of the Glendale district students were Armenian. That year, due to high levels of student absence around the Armenian Christmas (January 6) and the anniversary of the start of the Armenian genocide (Red Sunday, April 24), the district considered making Armenian holidays school holidays, eventually, starting in the 2016 year, the district started having April 24 off.

Governance
The district is governed by a board of education consisting of five trustees who are elected to four-year terms. The board of education also appoints a superintendent to oversee day-to-day operations of the district, as well as a non-voting student representative who serves during the school year. Effective with the April 2017 election, board of education members are elected by geographical district instead of at-large. Starting with the 2020 California Primary election, Glendale Unified School District Board of Education election is being held on the first Tuesday after the first Monday in March to comply with the statewide election law (Senate Bill 415).

The current board of education is as follows:
Dr. Vivian Ekchian – superintendent
Dr. Armina Gharpetian – president
Mrs. Nayiri Nahabedian – vice president
Mr. Gregory Krikorian – clerk
Mrs. Jennifer Freemon – member
Mr. Shant Sahakian – member

Election results

Source: City Clerk, City of Glendale

Schools

Elementary schools (Kindergarten – Grade 6)
Balboa Elementary School
Cerritos Elementary School
Columbus Elementary School (K-5th)
Dunsmore Elementary School
Thomas A. Edison Elementary School
Benjamin Franklin Elementary School
John C. Fremont Elementary School
Glenoaks Elementary School
Thomas Jefferson Elementary School
Mark Keppel Elementary School (K-5th)
La Crescenta Elementary School
Abraham Lincoln Elementary School
Horace Mann Elementary School (K-5th)
John Marshall Elementary School (K-5th)
Monte Vista Elementary School
Mountain Avenue Elementary School
John Muir Elementary School
Verdugo Woodlands Elementary School
Valley View Elementary School
Richardson D. White Elementary School (K-5th)

Middle schools (Grade 7 – Grade 8)
Theodore Roosevelt Middle School (Grade 6 through Grade 8)
Rosemont Middle School (Grade 7 and Grade 8)
Eleanor J. Toll Middle School (Grade 6 through Grade 8)
Woodrow Wilson Middle School  (Grade 6 through Grade 8)

High schools (Grade 9 – Grade 12)
Anderson W. Clark Magnet High School
Crescenta Valley High School
Glendale High School
Herbert Hoover High School
Allan F. Daily High School

Other schools
College View School – special-needs students
Verdugo Academy – independent/homeschool students
Jewel City Community Day School - independent students

Safety
The district contracts with the Glendale Police Department for schools within Glendale, and the Los Angeles County Sheriff's Department for schools within Montrose and La Crescenta.

Cybersurveillance of students
In 2012, the District hired Geo Listening for a pilot program to monitor public online activity of students at the Crescenta Valley, Glendale, and Hoover High Schools. While the school district has claimed that the program, now expanded to all of the District's schools, is meant to detect cyberbullying, critics have questioned whether it violates the privacy rights of students and whether the $40,500 spent on the program so far is well spent.

Analysts working for Geo Listening comb through posts students from Glendale Unified School District schools make on Facebook, Twitter and Instagram, reporting daily to school administrators. Reports include the student's user names, screen captures of their posts, and details on where they were when they made the post. An attorney with the ACLU characterized the program as "sweeping and far afield of what is necessary to ensure student safety."

References

Further reading
General Info |Source of Community Pride ''Glendale Unified School District, retrieved 20 February 2006
 GUSD Discussion Report No. 2
 GUSD General Information

External links

Education.com – GUSD school statistics and scores.

School districts in Los Angeles County, California
Education in Glendale, California